István Vágó (14 February 1949 in Budapest, Hungary) is a Hungarian television host and political activist, best known as the host of "Legyen ön is Milliomos!" the Hungarian version of Who Wants to Be a Millionaire?.

Life
Vágó was born and raised in Budapest. His original profession was a chemist, but he found a job working for Medimpex import-export company. Vágó speaks at least five languages.
When Vágó started his career he wanted to create a political show, but it was impossible to create one like he wanted (dealing with internal politics, analyzing decisions of the system) at the time so he ended up hosting quiz shows. 
Vágó has been hosting various game shows, mostly quiz shows, since the '70s. He has become one of the more popular TV personalities in Hungary. He is usually known as "The Quiz Professor" by Hungarians. Vágó hosted Millionaire for several years; after a hiatus the show got back on the air in 2007, with Vágó hosting the redesigned show once again. The second run proved less successful with an eventual cancellation in 2008.

He was the host of MTV for 22 years, then he changed for TV2, then RTL Klub. In 2009, he was the host of TV2, then
hosted a game show Átvágó, co-created by himself on Story4, which was cancelled after one season. Following the cancellation of Átvágó he announced his retirement as a television host.

Politics and views 
Vágó is an atheist and skeptic, and is  the former president of the Hungarian Skeptic Society. He vocally supports the Hungarian left-wing, most notably former prime minister Ferenc Gyurcsány and the liberal SZDSZ party. He was present at antifascist demonstrations. Vágó spawned controversy when he campaigned vocally for Ferenc Gyurcsány and health minister Ágnes Horváth. In 2014 he participated in the elections as a representative of the left wing, supporting Gyurcsány's party, Democratic Coalition.

In the 2014 municipal election, he ran as a candidate for local government as a joint candidate for the Democratic Coalition, the MSZP, the Co-PM, and the "European Federalists", though he told ATV that he did not understand local government politics. According to its flyer program, it would introduce a fairer local tax, abolish toll parking at unjustified locations, and take over the building, the burial cemetery of St. John's Parish in Upper Christina City on Apor Vilmos Square, and make it a playhouse. to preserve Normafa and prevent any investment planned there.  In an interview with HVG, he spoke in favor of Ferenc Gyurcsány and said that he was working to make DK leader a challenge for Viktor Orbán .

In January 2015, he joined the Democratic Coalition and became the leader of the party's media working group.

As a member of the party's national presidency, DK XII. District Representative in September 2016, replacing Szabolcs Kerék-Bárczy, who left the party.

Hobbies 
Vágó plays the guitar since his early teens, and is the bassist of Hungarian band Favágók. He is a huge fan of The Beatles and Paul McCartney.

Shows hosted by István Vágó 
 Van benne valami
 Kerék Bár
 Az ország tesztje
 Mindent vagy semmit (Hungarian version of Jeopardy!, aired during the mid-1990s)
 Legyen Ön is milliomos! (Who Wants to Be a Millionaire?)
 PókerArc (PokerFace; with Balázs Sebestyén, another Hungarian television host)
 Párbaj (Duel)
 Átvágó
 Hungarian commentator of the Eurovision Song Contest (1986–1989, 1990–1997)
 National final of the Eurovision Song Contest in Hungary (1996–1997)

References

External links 
 

1949 births
Living people
Hungarian television personalities
Hungarian bass guitarists
Male bass guitarists
Skeptics
Hungarian atheism activists
Democratic Coalition (Hungary) politicians
20th-century atheists
21st-century atheists